Jiří Veselý was the defending champion but chose not to defend his title.

Jelle Sels won the title after defeating Vasek Pospisil 6–4, 6–3 in the final.

Seeds

Draw

Finals

Top half

Bottom half

References

External links
Main draw
Qualifying draw

Internationaux de Tennis de Vendée - 1
2022 Singles